Kathai is a 2010 Indian Tamil-language drama film written and directed by Abhishek. Produced by Rajan Radhakrishnan and distributed through Madurai by noted director M. Sasikumar, the film stars newcomers Shaan Kumar and Nivedhitha, along with Abhinay in the lead roles. Deepa Venkat, Nalini, and Ganja Karuppu play supporting roles. The music was composed by newcomer Paul Jacob with cinematography by Abushah and editing by R. R. Eashwar. The film was released on 29 January 2010.

Plot
The movie opens when Narain (Shaan), an acclaimed writer, becoming a winner of the Booker prize for one of his works. While he dedicates the honour to his wife Kavya (Nivedhitha), a flashback reveals some secrets in the couple's life.

Narain first sees Kavya playing her violin in a musical theatre. After the performance, Narain and Kavya meet, where he asks her to sign his violin. Narain and Kavya become friends soon after, and they fall in love. One day, when Kavya comes to Narain's home, she notices his awards for his books and realizes that he is an esteemed writer. Narain asks Kavya to marry him right there, and she agrees.

Coming to the present, the husband and wife are now in the United States, where they meet Anand (Abhinay), a childhood friend of Kavya. Narain soon starts to write another book, and when Kavya reads it, she finds out that it is about their personal life, including intercourse. When she confronts her husband, Narain replies that it will only look like a story to the outside world. Narain continues to write his book about how a husband tortures his wife. To truly understand how it feels, Narain tortures Kavya, asking how it felt each time. One day, Anand comes to their home, where he observes how Narain mistreats Kavya. Knowing that Anand knows his secrets, Narain attacks and kills him. Finally, Kavya tries to flee her husband but gets caught. Narain wants to do another "experiment" on her and hangs her from their ceiling fan. Just before death, Narain snaps the rope to ask how Kavya felt and when she did not reply, he decided to hang himself to see how it feels like. On doing so, Narain kills himself, and Kavya is left alone.

Cast
 Shaan Kumar as Narain
 Nivedhitha as Kavya
 Abhinay as Anand
 Deepa Venkat 
 Nalini
 Ganja Karuppu 
 Crazy Kumar
 Balamurali Krishna as himself
 Malgudi Subha as herself 
 Chinnaponnu as herself

Production
In December 2008, the film was launched at the AVM Studios with a new cast and new crew, with Abhishek, a noted television actor, launching his first directorial venture. A song was shot in March 2009, with several prominent musicians appearing in the film, including Balamurali Krishna, Chinnaponnu and Malgadi Subha.

Release

Reception
The film opened in a few centres across Chennai, Tamil Nadu to a below average opening. The film which grossed Rs. 2,07,519 in the opening weekend in Chennai became a commercial failure at the box-office.

Reviews
Upon release, the film generally received average reviews, with The Hindu claiming that "a little more pace in the proceedings would have helped". In terms of performances it labelled Shaan Kumar as having "done a good job right from the beginning", but claimed that Nivedhitha was disappointing. Abinay was told to be "perfect for his role", whilst Nalini, 'Kanja' Karuppu and 'Crazy' Kumar "provide the laughs". Abhishek's direction received a mixed response with the review claiming that he has a "flair for story-telling. But if only he had cut certain unwanted shots, it would have made an interesting film".

Soundtrack

Film score and the soundtrack are composed by newcomer Paul Jacob. The film featured songs from notable singers such as Balamurali Krishna, Shankar Mahadevan, Malgudi Subha, Mahalaxmi Iyer, Blaaze, and Vasundhara Das.

References

External links 
 

2010 films
2010s Tamil-language films
Indian thriller drama films
2010 thriller drama films
2010 directorial debut films
2010 drama films